Arturo Gutiérrez (born 3 May 1973) is a Mexican judoka. He competed in the men's half-heavyweight event at the 1996 Summer Olympics.

References

1973 births
Living people
Mexican male judoka
Olympic judoka of Mexico
Judoka at the 1996 Summer Olympics
Place of birth missing (living people)